NOBIN (2-amino-2'-hydroxy-1,1'-binaphthyl) is an organic molecule used for asymmetric catalysis. NOBIN is related to BINOL and other analogs by both having a chiral axis and being a scaffold for certain chemical reactions. NOBIN is an excellent catalyst for the aldol reaction producing reliable products, good yields, and excellent diastereoselectivity.

Though rotation around the bond joining the rings is limited by the hydrogen atoms, enantiomerically pure NOBIN may racemize upon heating.

NOBIN is prepared by oxidative cross coupling of 2-naphthol and 2-naphthylamine. The oxidative source is metal ions in solution such as Fe2+ or a Cu2+ amine complex.  Once racemic NOBIN is produced, it needs to be resolved. One method for this is the use of camphorsulfonic acid, in which the basic group of NOBIN is used to form a diastereomeric salt of one enantiomer. The other enantiomer however will stay in solution.

References
Kocovsky, Smrcina, Lorenc, Hanus; Synlett;(1991) 231
Ding, Li; Ten years of research on NOBIN chemistry: Current Organic Synthesis;(2005);2;499-545

Catalysts
2-Naphthols
Naphthylamines